Dharkan (lit: Heartbeat) is a Pakistani television series that aired on Hum TV in 2016. It was produced by Momina Duraid under her banner MD Productions and directed by Fahim Burney. It aired Friday nights at 9:10pm PST replacing Sehra Main Safar. It stars debutant Zara Noor Abbas along-with Adeel Chaudhry, Waseem Abbas, Javed Sheikh, and Shameen Khan.

Plot
A drama serial about music loving Areen. She is the apple of the eye for her family. Unfortunately this full of life girl doesn't have long to live as she has a life threatening condition.
The story starts with Areen speaking about her life and her parents worrying her condition. Daniyal is Areen'scousin and he falls in love with Areen. But another entry in the story was of Zaran who was a playboy but he fell in love with Areen. The story in drama as their lives take a lot of twists with the new love in between (daniyal).At the end Like every story this story also ends with Areen and Zaran marrying each other.

Cast 
 Zara Noor Abbas as Areen 
 Omer Farooq as Daniyal
 Adeel Asghar as Zaran
 Waseem Abbas as Nafees (Areen's father)
 Javed Sheikh as Arif (Zaran's father)
 Hanif Bachan as Shirazi (Doctor)
 Ghana Ali as Esha
 Shameen Khan as Shehrbano (Zaran's fiancée)
 Farah Nadeem as Samina (Daniyal's mother, Hajra's sister)
 Anas Ali Imran as Yasir (Zaran's friend)
 Beena Chaudhary as Hajra (Samina's sister, Areen's mother)
 Anjum Habibi as Seema (Zaran's mother)

See also
 2016 in Pakistani television 
 List of programs broadcast by Hum TV

References

External links 
 
 MD Productions

Hum TV
Hum Network Limited
Hum TV original programming
Pakistani telenovelas
Pakistani romantic drama television series
Serial drama television series
MD Productions
Television series by MD Productions
Television series created by Momina Duraid
Urdu-language television shows
2016 Pakistani television series debuts